The Los Angeles Kings Monument (also known as the 50th Anniversary Monument and the LA Kings Monument) is a monument by artists Itamar Amrany, Julie Rotblatt Amrany, and Omri Amrany, installed outside Los Angeles' Crypto.com Arena, in the U.S. state of California.

Unveiled in 2016, the monument is 12 feet tall and 30 feet wide. Made of bronze, granite and glass, the monument features six bronze sculptures. The monument is located on Chick Hearn Court by Georgia Street.

From left to right, the monument depicts the following athletes:
Jonathan Quick
Drew Doughty imprinted on the wall
Marcel Dionne
Dave Taylor
Rob Blake
Anze Kopitar
Dustin Brown hoisting the Stanley Cup

References 

2016 establishments in California
2016 sculptures
Bronze sculptures in California
Glass art
Granite sculptures in California
Los Angeles Kings
Monuments and memorials in Los Angeles
Outdoor sculptures in Greater Los Angeles
Sculptures of men in California
South Park (Downtown Los Angeles)